Enrique Montano (born 18 August 1964) is a Bolivian alpine skier. He competed in two events at the 1988 Winter Olympics.

References

1964 births
Living people
Bolivian male alpine skiers
Olympic alpine skiers of Bolivia
Alpine skiers at the 1988 Winter Olympics
Place of birth missing (living people)